was a Japanese film director.

Filmography
The filmography of Kōzō Saeki include 110 films as film director and other works:
 (猛獣使いの少女 Mōjū Tsukai no Shōjo) (1952)
 The Badger Palace (大当り狸御殿 Ōatari Tanuki Goten) aka The Princess of Badger Palace (1958)
 Hot Spring Ghost (1964)
 Izukoe (1966)

Notes

References

External links

1912 births
1972 deaths
Japanese film directors